Writers & Company is a Canadian radio show that airs Sunday afternoons on CBC Radio One. Hosted by Eleanor Wachtel, the program broadcasts interviews with Canadian and international writers.
The show airs Sunday afternoons at 5:00 p.m. Manitoba and west, 3:00 p.m. Ontario and east, 3:30 Newfoundland and Labrador. It repeats on Tuesdays at 3 p.m. (but is heard only in areas where CBC Radio's local show begins at 4 p.m.).

The theme song of Writers & Company is "Long As You Know You're Living Yours" by Keith Jarrett.

The show reportedly began airing in 1990, with Wachtel as host from the start.

After a special interview with Nadine Gordimer in 1991, which occupied the full length of the programme, the show gradually shifted to a format where each episode is devoted to a long-form interview with one author, which is unusual among literary radio shows.

A columnist in The Irish Times said Writers & Company "may be the best author interview programme around".

References

External links
 Writers & Company

CBC Radio One programs
Literary radio programs
Book podcasts